The United Dioceses of Meath and Kildare is a diocese in the Church of Ireland located in the Republic of Ireland. The diocese is in the ecclesiastical province of Dublin. Alone of English and Irish bishops who are not also archbishops, the Bishop of Meath and Kildare is styled "The Most Reverend".

The electoral college met in Christ Church Cathedral, Dublin on 28 May 2013 and no candidate put forward received the support of two-thirds of the electoral college voting in orders (lay and clergy). On 20 September 2013, it was announced that the House of Bishops (to whom the appointment had lapsed on the failure of the college's vote) had appointed as bishop-elect Pat Storey, who  became the first woman to be a bishop in the Church of Ireland.

History of the Diocese of Meath

Although there had been abbot-bishops at Clonard Abbey since the sixth century, the Diocese of Clonard proper was not formally established until 1111. It was one of the twenty-four dioceses established by the Synod of Rathbreasail. The diocese covered roughly the western part of the Kingdom of Meath with the bishop's seat located at Clonard Abbey. During the twelfth century, the bishops of Clonard acquired most of Meath as their territory and frequently used the title "Bishop of Meath" or "Bishop of the men of Meath". After Bishop Simon Rochfort transferred his seat from Clonard to Trim in 1202, the normal style became the "Bishop of Meath".

History of the Diocese of Kildare

In the 5th century, the Abbey of Kildare was founded by Saint Brigid, a double monastery of nuns and monks. The abbey was governed by an abbess, who was the "heir of Brigit" (comarbae Brigte), and by abbots, bishops and abbot-bishops who were subordinate to the abbess. It was not until the 12th century however, that the bishopric was formally established at the Synod of Rathbreasail (1111 AD). The diocese covered roughly the northern part of County Kildare and the eastern part of County Offaly.

Diocesan structure

In Meath
The cathedral church of the former diocese is Trim Cathedral. There are ten parishes in this part of the United Dioceses: Athboy, Athlone, Castlepollard (Rathgraffe), Clara, Julianstown, Kells, Mullingar, Navan, Trim, and Tullamore (Kilbride). The dean is the Dean of Clonmacnoise.

In Kildare
The cathedral church of the former diocese is Kildare Cathedral. There are six parishes in this part of the United Dioceses: Clane, Clonsast (Clonbullogue), Mountmellick, Naas, Newbridge (Morristownbiller), and Portarlington St Paul (French Church). The dean is the Dean of Kildare.

List of bishops of Meath and Kildare

See also
 List of Anglican dioceses in the United Kingdom and Ireland
 Roman Catholic Diocese of Meath
 Roman Catholic Diocese of Kildare and Leighlin

References

 
Meath
Religion in County Meath
Religion in County Kildare
Religion in County Cavan
Religion in County Laois
Religion in County Westmeath
Archdeacons of Meath and Kildare
Church of Ireland in the Republic of Ireland